Benjamin David Kurland (born May 1, 1984) is an American actor, known for his role in the Academy Award winning film The Artist. He was born in Boston, Massachusetts, to parents Jim and Robyne Kurland.  He and his older brother Zack Kurland grew up in Dedham and Newton, Massachusetts.

Early life and education
He first started acting at age 11, performing in a local theatre production of Anne of Green Gables. During the summer, he attended the Walnut Hill School. While in 7th grade at The Fessenden School, he was encouraged by a teacher to audition for a part in the school play, Little Shop of Horrors. Despite his young age, he was cast as the lead in the show. The following year, Kurland was performing again in Oliver! while simultaneously working with his cousin Jaime Ray Newman in Boston University's production of Stop the World: I Want to Get Off. Before attending high school, Kurland had been in over a dozen plays.

At Choate Rosemary Hall, Kurland continued to pursue acting.  He was cast as Jerry in a production of The Zoo Story, which was guest directed by Edward Albee himself. This made national news when an article featuring Kurland and Albee was published in the Sunday edition of The New York Times. After graduation, Kurland attended Emerson College's Theatre program. However, he soon transferred to the University of Southern California School of Theatre. While at USC, he was briefly on the USC Ice Hockey Team, and performed in several student films. He graduated from USC in 2006.

Career
In his final year at USC, Kurland starred in Taps, which won first prize at the Rhode Island International Film Festival in 2006. Since then, Kurland has been seen on TLC and Spike TV, and he starred in Sinners, a drama from Eleven Eleven Pictures (Best Picture, Swansea Bay Film Festival 2007). In 2011, Kurland was in The Artist starring John Goodman, James Cromwell, and Penelope Ann Miller. Next, Ben starred in Deadly Retreat, a horror comedy, opposite "Mean Girls" star Jonathan Bennett After that, he was cast as the leading man in Michael Biehn's psychological thriller "Mindless". In 2015, Ben played the son of Academy Award Nominated actor Bruce Davison in "Tell Me Your Name", and a struggling musician in Disney Director Stephen J. Anderson's "Sugar".

Awards and nominations

References

External links

Picture of Ben Kurland at the 69th Golden Globe Awards
Pictures of Ben Kurland on Zimbio

1984 births
Male actors from Boston
Living people
USC School of Dramatic Arts alumni
People from Dedham, Massachusetts
Fessenden School alumni